Sepúlveda Point is the south entrance point of Recess Cove, in Charlotte Bay on the Danco Coast. The feature was named "Punta Sepúlveda" by the Chilean Antarctic Expedition of 1952, after Teniente (Lt.) Hernan Sepúlveda Gore, of the patrol ship Lientur which worked in the area.

References

Headlands of Graham Land
Danco Coast